Flotwedel is a Samtgemeinde ("collective municipality") in the district of Celle, in Lower Saxony, Germany. It is situated on the river Aller, approx. 10 km southeast of Celle. Its seat is in Wienhausen.

The Samtgemeinde Flotwedel consists of the following municipalities:

 Bröckel 
 Eicklingen 
 Langlingen 
 Wienhausen

Samtgemeinden in Lower Saxony